Jørgen Brønlund Fjord or Bronlund Fjord is a fjord in southern Peary Land, northern Greenland.

It was named after polar explorer Jørgen Brønlund by the Danmark expedition.

Geography
It runs roughly from NW to SE with its mouth located at the western end of Melville Land, between Cape Harald Moltke to the east and Cape Knud Rasmussen to the west. The Børglum River has its mouth on the left side of the fjord.

Brønlundhus, a former research station, is located on the west side close to the mouth of the fjord, and Kap Harald Moltke, another similar facility, on the east side. Brønlundhus was, until 1950, the northernmost radio outpost in the world.

The northern shore is the type locality of the Buen Formation.

See also
Brønlund Fjord Group
Deltaterrasserne
List of fjords of Greenland
List of features in Greenland named after Greenlandic Inuit

References

External links
Helicopters are down away from Jorgen Bronlund Fjord, military crews are reunited and charts are reviewed, in the snow and ice of Greenland, in 1960.

Brondlund Fjord
Peary Land